Goggle jackets are a hooded windproof type jacket released in 1988 made by C.P. Company for the sponsoring of Mille Miglia and open car endurance race and became popular across Europe and in Britain. They zip up to cover the head and face completely, except for two built-in goggles, sometimes covered with transparent mesh or various lenses and sometimes including a mesh mouth area for ease of breathing.

Some people wear them to protect their faces against cold and driven rain, some for concealment.

Criticism
Police have claimed goggle jackets could be used by gangs and criminals to conceal their identity. A Northumbria Police spokesman said the jackets were totally legal. "A hat, scarf and glasses combination could obscure someone's identity so there are no legal powers to stop anyone wearing these jackets." he added. One web site calls them "burqas for the boys".

See also
Anorak
Hoodie

References

Link to image
Google search for images of goggle jackets

Jackets
History of fashion
2000s fashion
2010s fashion
Coats (clothing)